The list of points of interest in Kansas City, Missouri includes businesses, museums, historical monuments, and theme parks.

Arts

American Jazz Museum, in the 18th and Vine Historic District
Community Christian Church, designed by Frank Lloyd Wright with 1.2 billion candlepower "Spire of Light", open for tours, on the Plaza.
Crossroads Arts District, warehouse district with art galleries and restaurants.
Laugh-O-Gram Studio, Walt Disney's original cartoon studio in Kansas City. Now being renovated.
Thomas Hart Benton Home and Studio State Historic Site, regionalist painter's residence, with 13 original works of art on display.
Nelson-Atkins Museum of Art, encyclopedic collection of over 35,000 works of art. Open six days a week; admission is free.

Business
Hallmark Cards Tour, company history and interactive displays at headquarters in Crown Center complex.
Harley-Davidson factory tour, motorcycle manufacturer's Vehicle and Powertrain Operations plant tours. 
Kansas City Board of Trade Tour.
Boulevard Brewing Company Tour, America's 7th largest craft brewer, manufacturing tour and beer tasting.

Historical buildings

Science City at Union Station, interactive science center, Gottlieb Planetarium, City Extreme Screen theater, and exhibitions.
Union Station, now with restaurants, shopping, and special shows.
Tiffany Castle, former home of Flavel B. Tiffany who founded the neighborhood of Tiffany Springs
City workhouse castle, a former city jail

Memorial and landmark structures
Liberty Memorial and National World War I Museum.

Museums

Airline History Museum at Charles B. Wheeler Downtown Airport.
The Money Museum of the Federal Reserve Bank of Kansas City, with exhibits and tours of the multi-story cash vault.
Irish Museum and Cultural Center located in Kansas City's Union Station. 
Kansas City Museum at Corinthian Hall, local area history and natural sciences museum in a Beaux-Arts mansion.
Nelson-Atkins Museum of Art, the region's largest art museum, located near the Country Club Plaza (see below)
Arabia Steamboat Museum, artifacts and history of a sidewheel steamboat sunk in 1856, recovered in 1987-88, with interactive displays and tour.
The National Toy and Miniature Museum, formerly the Toy and Miniature Museum of Kansas City, is the largest collection of classic toys and fine-scale miniatures in the Midwest.
Trailside Center, a tourist center, museum, and community facility.  Items on display include exhibits of Civil War items related to the Battle of Westport as well as items related to the Santa Fe, Oregon, and California trails.  The center is staffed by volunteers.

Parks

Battle of Little Blue River site, Big Blue Battlefield Park, 63rd and Manchester Tfwy, American Civil War site.
Battle of Westport sites, one of the major battles of the American Civil War.
Ewing and Muriel Kauffman Memorial Garden, arboretum near Country Club Plaza
Hodge Park
Kansas City Zoo, 10th largest zoo in the United States, located in Swope Park.
Lakeside Nature Center, large, city-operated wildlife rescue and nature center with exhibits and woodland trails in Swope Park.
Loose Park, the third largest park in Kansas City, includes Rose Garden and Civil War markers from the Battle of Westport.
Swope Park, a 1,805-acre city park.
Shoal Creek Living History Museum, 20 authentic buildings from the 1800s; events, tours, and historical reenactments, in 1,000-acre Hodge Park
Worlds of Fun and Oceans of Fun amusement parks.

Shopping

Power & Light District, Kansas City's downtown entertainment district with clubs, bars, & restaurants.
Country Club Plaza, first shopping center designed to accommodate the automobile; boutiques, stores, and dining.
Crown Center shopping, entertainment, restaurant, and hotel complex.
Westport, historic district; restaurants, entertainment, and nightlife.
Zona Rosa, recent mixed-use development – retail, office and residential; shopping, restaurants, and entertainment. 
City Market, large farmers' market in River Market district, where the original Town of Kansas was founded.
45th and State Line, antiques district with several stores and antique dealers.

Sports

Arrowhead Stadium, home of the Kansas City Chiefs
College Basketball Experience and National Collegiate Basketball Hall of Fame, next to the Sprint Center.
Kaufmann Stadium, home of the Kansas City Royals
Children's Mercy Park, home of Sporting Kansas City
Kemper Arena (now called Hy-Vee Arena), former home to the now defunct Kansas City Renegades of the Champions Professional Indoor Football League.
Negro Leagues Baseball Museum, in the 18th and Vine Historic District.

See also
List of museums in Kansas City, Missouri
Independence, Missouri, in the KC metro, includes the Truman Library.
Overland Park, Kansas, in the KC metro, includes the Overland Park Arboretum and Botanical Gardens and Deanna Rose Children's Farmstead.
Kansas City, Kansas includes Children's Mercy Park and the Rosedale World War I Memorial Arch.

References